The men's competition in the super-heavyweight (+ 105 kg) division was staged on November 29, 2009.

Schedule

Medalists

Records

Results

References
Results 

- Mens +105 kg, 2009 World Weightlifting Championships